Abdulkadir Beyazıt (born 4 November 1996) is a German footballer who plays as a forward for CFC Hertha 06.

References

External links
 Profile at DFB.de
 

1996 births
German people of Turkish descent
Footballers from Berlin
Living people
German footballers
Association football forwards
FC Viktoria 1889 Berlin players
SV Babelsberg 03 players
FC Energie Cottbus players
Berliner AK 07 players
1461 Trabzon footballers
CFC Hertha 06 players
Regionalliga players
3. Liga players
TFF Second League players
Oberliga (football) players
German expatriate footballers
Expatriate footballers in Turkey
German expatriate sportspeople in Turkey